The 2010 Kohistan avalanche occurred in the Kohistan District, North West Frontier Province, Pakistan on February 17, 2010, striking the village of Bagaro Serai and killing at least 38 people.

Incident 
The avalanche came down on at least four houses in the remote village, which has been struck by heavy snow storms in recent days. According to local officials, rescue teams faced difficulties getting into the village as all the roads were blocked due to the avalanche and further landslides. Police and volunteers had to hike through the night to reach the scene of the avalanche and the police faced communication problems as radio reception was hampered by the mountainous terrain. A search for stranded people was being conducted and a request had been made to send a helicopter and heavy machinery to the village to assist in the rescue operation.

Response
Prime Minister Yousaf Raza Gilani expressed his grief and sorrow for the loss of lives and the destruction of properties caused by the avalanche. He has directed authorities to speed up the rescue operation and the safe evacuation of trapped people in the village.

References

Avalanches in Pakistan
2010 disasters in Pakistan
2010 natural disasters
2010s avalanches
History of Khyber Pakhtunkhwa (1947–present)
February 2010 events in Pakistan